Sex in a can may refer to:

Testosterone spray, a transdermal topical spray containing the sex hormone testosterone
Fleshlight, a sex toy, designed for use as a masturbation aid for men